Hybosorus is a genus of scavenger scarab beetles in the family Hybosoridae. There are about eight described species in Hybosorus.

Species
 Hybosorus crassus Klug, 1855
 Hybosorus curtulus Fairmaire, 1887
 Hybosorus laportei Westwood, 1845
 Hybosorus orientalis Westwood, 1845
 Hybosorus roei Westwood, 1845 (= illigeri)
 Hybosorus ruficornis Boheman, 1857

Extinct species
†Hybosorus lividus Heer 1862 Upper Freshwater-Molasse Formation, Germany, Miocene
†Hybosorus ocampoi Bai and Zhang 2016 Burmese amber, Myanmar, Cenomanian

References

Further reading

External links

 

Scarabaeoidea genera
Articles created by Qbugbot